Michael Wallace (born 9 November 1955) is an Irish politician and former property developer who has been a Member of the European Parliament (MEP) from Ireland for the South constituency since July 2019. He is a member of Independents 4 Change, part of The Left in the European Parliament – GUE/NGL. He was a Teachta Dála (TD) for the Wexford constituency from 2011 to 2019.

Entering politics in 2011 following the post-2008 Irish economic downturn, Wallace was almost immediately considered to be one of the most eccentric and unconventional figures in Irish national politics.  Establishing a reputation for anti-establishment and populist views, Wallace became a frequent guest on the political debate show Tonight with Vincent Browne in the process. He soon aligned himself with Clare Daly, forming a political duo still operating as a unit today. In 2012 it emerged that during his time as a property developer, Wallace's company owed €2.1 million to the state in unpaid value-added taxes. 

In recent years Wallace has gained attention for his foreign policy views, particularly regarding Russia and China, which have been the subject of controversy and criticism.

Personal life
Born at Wellington Bridge in County Wexford, one of a family of 12 children, he graduated from University College Dublin with a teaching qualification. He married Mary Murphy from Duncormick, County Wexford in 1979; the couple had two sons, but the marriage ended when the children were young. Wallace had two more children from another relationship in the 1990s.

In 2007, Wallace founded the Wexford Football Club which he managed for their first three seasons, and is chairman of its board. The club is in the League of Ireland First Division.

Prior to entering politics Wallace owned a property development and construction company completing developments such as The Italian Quarter in the Ormond Quay area of the Dublin quays. The company later collapsed into liquidation, with Wallace finally being declared bankrupt on 19 December 2016.

Political career
Wallace has held various positions at both a national and European level as a politician.

2011 general election
On 5 February 2011, while a guest on Tonight with Vincent Browne, Wallace made the announcement that he intended to contest the upcoming general election on 25 February as an independent candidate. He topped the poll in the Wexford constituency with 13,329 votes. According to John Dwyer, who stood against him in that election, Wallace's tax affairs were "the talk of the pubs, all of these things were known. Because he was such a rebel, because he was prepared to stick the finger up at the authorities, he got elected."

Independents 4 Change
Wallace is the listed officer of the Independents 4 Change, which was registered to stand for elections in March 2014 and along with Clare Daly is one of two MEPs which represent the party in the European parliament.

During their time in the Dáil, Wallace and Dublin North TD Clare Daly became friends and political allies, and worked together on many campaigns, including opposition to austerity and highlighting revelations of alleged Garda malpractices, including harassment, improper cancellation of penalty points and involvement of officers in the drug trade. Wallace and Daly were partially active in protesting the Garda whistleblower scandal, which eventually caused the resignation of Minister for Justice Frances Fitzgerald, although she was later cleared of wrongdoing by the Charleton Tribunal.

2016 General election
At the 2016 general election, Wallace stood as an Independents 4 Change candidate and was re-elected, finishing third on the first-preference count with 7,917 votes.

Political views during his time in the Dáil
Wallace has stated that the welfare of women working in prostitution would be improved if the trade were not pushed underground.

He said he was "a bit flabbergasted" by the introduction of the household charge brought in as part of the 2012 Budget, and by how that party had changed from when it was in opposition. On 15 December 2011, he helped to launch a nationwide campaign against the household charge.

Wallace was criticised and accused of "defending terrorism" by Joan Burton, then Ireland's Tánaiste, for comments he made during the November 2015 Paris attacks. While the attacks were unfolding, Wallace posted on his Twitter account "So terrible for the victims, but when is France going to stop its role in the militarisation of the planet?", sparking an angry reaction on social media.

In July 2014, Wallace and Daly were arrested at Shannon Airport while trying to board a US military aircraft. Wallace said the airport was being used as a US military base and that the government should be searching the planes to ensure that they are not involved in military operations or that there are no weapons on board. Wallace was fined €2,000 for being in an airside area without permission, and chose not to pay. He was sentenced to 30 days in prison in default, and in December 2015 was arrested for non-payment of the fine. Joan Burton accused Wallace of "putting Irish people at risk" of terrorism by repeatedly linking Shannon Airport to US-led wars "simply for the sake of some media coverage".

In December 2015, Wallace and independent TDs Clare Daly and Maureen O'Sullivan each put forward offers of a €5,000 surety for a man charged with membership of an unlawful organisation and with possession of a component part of an improvised explosive device.

Member of the European Parliament
At the 2019 European Parliament election, he was elected as an MEP for the South constituency.

Mick Wallace has been criticised for supporting Venezuela, Ecuador, China, Russia, Belarus and Syria during his period as an MEP. In November 2020, Wallace referred to Belarusian opposition presidential candidate Svetlana Tikhanovskaya as a "pawn of western neoliberalism". In February 2021, Wallace was reprimanded for using a swear word during a session of the European Parliament. Wallace had referred to Venezuelan opposition leader Juan Guaidó as being an "unelected gobshite".

In April 2021, Wallace and Clare Daly were called "embarrassments to Ireland" by Fianna Fail's Malcolm Byrne after the two MEPs had travelled to Iraq and visited the headquarters of the Popular Mobilization Forces, an Iraqi militia supported by Iran. Byrne criticised them for meeting with a group that supports the oppression of gay people and accused them of being used as propaganda by the militia. The Popular Mobilization Forces later posted video footage on YouTube of Wallace and Daly.

Wallace questioned the director general of the Organisation for the Prohibition of Chemical Weapons (OPCW), Fernando Arias, in the European Parliament in April 2021. He accused the OPCW of falsely blaming the government of Bashar al-Assad for the 2018 Douma chemical attack. He said that, while he did not know what had happened in Douma, the White Helmets were "paid for by the US and UK to carry out regime change in Syria". Fianna Fáil’s Barry Andrews called Wallace's accusation against the White Helmets a conspiracy theory and disinformation. French MEP Nathalie Loiseau described Wallace's comments as "fake news" and apologised on his behalf to NGO groups in Syria.

In June, Wallace and Daly were among the MEPs censured by the European Parliament's Democracy Support and Election Coordination Group for acting as unofficial election-monitors in the December 2020 Venezuelan parliamentary election and April 2021 Ecuadorian general election without a mandate or permission from the EU. Official European overseas trips have been suspended during the COVID-19 pandemic. Wallace and Daly were barred until the end of 2021 from making any election missions. They were warned that any further such action may result in their ejection from the European parliament under the end of their terms in 2024. While MEPs can make personal trips overseas, according to The Irish Times, Wallace and Daly made no mention in their tweets that they were acting in an unofficial capacity.

Daly and Wallace issued a joint statement in response that read: "This is a political stunt by the centre right parties in the European Parliament, and we will be challenging it. These were not ‘fake’ election-observation trips. We made abundantly clear by public announcement at the time that we were not visiting Ecuador or Venezuela with an official election observation mandate." They continued: "Although we regret that the Ecuadorian people did not choose Andrés Arauz as their president, we found the elections to be conducted fairly and impartially, and their results are beyond question." Ecuadorian election officials complained that Wallace could not be an objective election observer while openly supporting one side, such as Andrés Arauz, over the other.

Wallace has stated his opposition to vaccination certificates. He has said "I’m not anti-vax but we’re going down a dangerous path with Covid pass" and expressed concerns about civil liberties. Both Wallace and Daly have refused to present vaccination certs upon entering the European Parliament, resulting in them being reprimanded by the European Parliament.

In April 2022, Wallace and Daly initiated defamation proceedings against RTÉ.

On 15 September 2022, he was one of 16 MEPs who voted against condemning President Daniel Ortega of Nicaragua for human rights violations, in particular the arrest of Bishop Rolando Álvarez.

In November 2022, Wallace criticised protests in Iran following the death of Mahsa Amini, accusing some protestors of violence and destruction and saying it "would not be tolerated anywhere".

Views on sanctions 
Wallace has called out the application of sanctions by the US and EU as being illegal as "they don't comply with the UN Charter". On 5 April 2022 Wallace made a proposal in European Parliament opposing the sanctions on Russia in response to the war in Ukraine. The resolution reaffirmed that the sanctions were illegal stating "Human Rights Council Resolution 27/21 and on human rights and unilateral coercive measures stresses that unilateral coercive measures and legislation are contrary to international law".

Views on Russia 
According to The Irish Times, Wallace and Clare Daly's positions caused tensions within The Left in the European Parliament – GUE/NGL. Tensions boiled over when Wallace and Daly tabled amendments in the European Parliament on behalf of the Left group seeking to remove parts of resolutions about Russia in relation to the shooting down of Malaysia Airlines Flight 17 by Russian backed militias in Donbas. 298 passengers and crew were killed in the incident, 193 of them Dutch. The Irish Times said a rift developed between Wallace's and Dutch MEP and fellow GUE/NGL member Anja Hazekamp over Flight MH17.

Wallace has attended protests supporting Lithuanian Algirdas Paleckis, a politician convicted of spying on behalf of Russia, and attended court when Paleckis' appeal was being heard. Wallace said of Paleckis "He's accused of being a Russian spy because he expressed an opinion that the State didn't like" and that the conviction was "authoritarianism".

After Russia formally recognised the Donetsk and Luhansk people's republics, Wallace called for the abolition of NATO; "The people of Europe must campaign for the abolition of NATO, it has nothing good to offer anyone that prefers peace to war". Wallace, with Daly, had previously been one of the 52 MEPs who voted against an EU motion to provide Ukraine with €1.2 billion in loans (compared to 598 MEPs in favour).

In March 2022, Wallace voted against a European Parliament resolution to condemn the Russian invasion of Ukraine, demand Vladimir Putin withdraw his troops and send weapons to Ukraine. Wallace later stated that he opposed Russian aggression against Ukraine and that he had opposed the resolution because it had called for sending weapons to Ukraine, stating that "the way forward is not putting in more arms and guns in there, the way forward is negotiation". Russian state media subsequently played clips of him criticizing the EU response to the Russian invasion.

In November 2022, Wallace voted against a resolution to declare Russia a state sponsor of terrorism.

Views on China
Wallace spoke in the European Parliament in May 2021 about the EU's hostility to China, saying "Why are we choosing an aggressive position with China? Why are we not choosing co-operation instead of aggression? Why are we not respecting the principle of state sovereignty and non-interference? We should be working for peace with China, it’s in our interests". Fine Gael Teachta Dála (TD) Neale Richmond criticized his comments and questioned why Wallace was "lionizing China, Russia, Belarus, Syria".

In July 2021, Wallace claimed reports of one million Chinese citizens of the Uighur ethnicity being detained in concentration camps were "grossly exaggerated". He was critical of the anti-Chinese rhetoric that he said was taking place in the European Parliament and in some Irish media. Wallace made the comments in an interview with Irish radio station Newstalk. Previously he had said China "takes better care of its people" than the European Union in an interview with Chinese state-run newspaper Global Times, and stated that the Chinese Communist Party "deserved a lot of credits" for "helping so many hundreds of millions in China to move out of poverty."

In October 2021, Wallace released a video on social media in which he dismissed the idea of Uighur mass detention camps, stating that there was "never any solid evidence" of their existence. In the same video, Wallace said that Taiwan is part of the People's Republic of China and "is recognised as such by the United Nations". Wallace's video was subsequently broadcast on Chinese state media, prompting the government of Taiwan to offer an official rebuke of his claims. A spokesperson for the Taiwanese government in Dublin stated in response to Wallace, that the United Nations did not "authorise the People’s Republic of China to represent Taiwan in the United Nations, let alone claim that Taiwan is part of the People’s Republic of China. Taiwan is a vibrant democracy that is appreciated and supported by like-minded partners around the world. The right to democratic self-determination should not and will not be forfeited". Wallace's comments also prompted other Irish politicians to speak out against him. Fianna Fail's John McGuinness TD said he was "flabbergasted" upon first seeing Wallace's video and called upon Wallace to delete it. Fine Gael Senator Jerry Buttimer called upon Wallace to speak to Taiwanese groups in Ireland and to respect the right of "democratic self-determination".

A report by The Irish Times in April 2022 described Wallace and Daly's media profile in China, and discussed how since January 2021, Wallace had been featured in more Chinese-language news articles than any other Irish person aside from Daly.

Other incidents

Financial issues and bankruptcy

In May 2011, Wallace said that he would face personal financial ruin and the possible loss of his Dáil seat, if banks were to chase him for personal guarantees he had given them. According to Wallace, his company had passed rents it collected directly to ACCBank since 2008. In a statement Wallace said: "I've tried to build well — we were a very successful company for a long time. We weren't bad, we weren't doing crazy things. We've made money every year for 20 years, employed a lot of people, paid our taxes. But the financial crisis arrived, completely undermined the value of our assets and we're no longer in a great place." He told RTÉ, "If a bank tries to make me bankrupt it has more to do with 'badness' than economics." On 10 October 2011, the Commercial Court ordered Wallace to repay more than €19 million owed to ACCBank. He said he did not have the money.

On 30 January 2016, it was ruled that Wallace would have to pay €2m to US vulture fund Cerberus. Wallace was finally declared bankrupt on 19 December 2016 with debts of over €30 million.

Revenue settlement
In June 2012, The Irish Times reported that Wallace had made a seven-figure settlement with the Revenue Commissioners for under-payment of VAT. The sum related to his company MJ Wallace Ltd. Wallace admitted in the course of the article that he had knowingly made false declarations to the authorities. Under the agreement with Revenue, MJ Wallace Ltd was found to have under-declared VAT liabilities on returns by €1,418,894. Interest came to €289,146 and penalties amounting to €425,668 were imposed, giving a total of €2,133,708. Ceann Comhairle Seán Barrett wrote to the Oireachtas Committee on Members' Interests Chairman, asking him to convene an inquiry.

Hitman comments
When Wallace stated on The Marian Finucane Show in October 2012 that back in 2005 he once "threatened to hire a hitman to recover an IR£20,000 debt from a building firm", a complaint was filed with Gardaí by a former Navy officer who runs a public information website. Later the same month, Finian McGrath resigned as chairman of the Dáil technical group when Wallace returned to the loose alliance against the wishes of many of its members.

Mary Mitchell O'Connor comments
Shortly after being elected, while referring to Mary Mitchell O'Connor in Dáil Éireann, he said "Miss Piggy has toned it down a bit today". He accepted responsibility and later apologised, saying "It was my fault. I passed the reference because of her handbag. I'm completely out of order. I don't have a leg to stand on […] Clearly it was in bad taste." He called Mitchell O'Connor to apologise and said he would write a letter of apology to her as well.

Alan Shatter data breach controversy
During a debate between the then Minister for Justice and Equality, Alan Shatter and Wallace on RTÉ television in May 2013, Shatter divulged that Wallace had been cautioned by Gardaí for using his phone while driving. Shatter was later found to have broken General Data Protection Regulation laws by revealing personal information about Wallace. Shatter said he obtained the information from then Garda Commissioner, Martin Callinan. Callinan and Shatter both lost their jobs soon afterward, Shatter partially for this breach of the law among other controversies. Wallace disagreed with the appointment of Callinan's successor Nóirín O'Sullivan, citing her previous role as deputy commissioner to Callinan.

Undeclared income as an MEP
In February 2023 Wallace claimed on social media that he had "three wine bars in Dublin". This aroused alarm from Wallace's European parliamentary group, as no such assets were listed on his mandatory declaration of financial interests. After the chair of his parliamentary group called any omission from the declaration "unacceptable” and not “worthy of our political group”, Wallace amended his declaration to state that he is an "advisor" to the three wine bars, and receives up to €500 a month in income for this role.

References

External links

 

1955 births
Living people
Alumni of University College Dublin
Independent TDs
Irish anti-war activists
Irish politicians convicted of crimes
Irish sportsperson-politicians
Irish tax resisters
Irish women's rights activists
League of Ireland managers
Members of the 31st Dáil
Members of the 32nd Dáil
Politicians from County Wexford
Republic of Ireland football managers
Wexford F.C. managers
Independents 4 Change TDs
MEPs for the Republic of Ireland 2019–2024
Independents 4 Change MEPs
Irish businesspeople in real estate
Uyghur genocide denial